Malthodes minimus is a species of soldier beetles native to Europe.

References

Cantharidae
Beetles described in 1758
Taxa named by Carl Linnaeus
Beetles of Europe